José Ángel Córdova Villalobos (born 19 August 1953, in Mexico) is a Mexican politician who served as Secretary of Health and Secretary of Public Education during Felipe Calderón administration.

Córdova Villalobos obtained a medical degree, and an MA in Public Administration, a Specialty in State and Municipal Public Administration and an MA in Administration from the University of Guanajuato, among other qualifications. He was a delegate in the  parliamentary group in the 59th Session of the Mexican Congress (2003-2006), during which he directed the Health Commission.

Career
 President of the Ministers’ Club for EPODE International Network (EIN), the world's largest obesity-prevention network, 2013.
 Head of the Medical Education Division of the Hospital Ángeles and full-time professor at the Medicine Faculty of the University of Guanajuato (since 2002).
 President of the General Council of the Electoral Institute of the State of Guanajuato (1997–2002).
 Director of the Academy of Professors and Students of the Medicine Faculty of the University of Guanajuato (1998–2000).
 Research Project Assessor of the SSA-CONCYTEG competition, Guanajuato (2001).
 Professor in the B.Sc. in Nutrition of the Medicine Faculty of the University of Guanajuato (since 2001).
 Civic Advisor of the General Council of the Electoral Institute of the State of Guanajuato (1994).
 Vice-President of the Mexican Association of Medicine Faculties and Schools (1993–1994).
 Director of the Medicine Faculty of the University of Guanajuato (1990–1997).
 President of the Undergraduate Surgical Education Commission of the Mexican Association of General Surgery (1995–1996).
 Editor of the Revista Mexicana de Educación Médica (1993–1997).

References

20th-century Mexican physicians
Mexican Secretaries of Health
National Action Party (Mexico) politicians
Politicians from Guanajuato
People from León, Guanajuato
1963 births
Living people
Universidad de Guanajuato alumni
Academic staff of Universidad de Guanajuato
21st-century Mexican politicians